Galang may refer to:

 "Galang" (song), a song by M.I.A. from Arular
 Galang (surname), a Filipino surname
 Galang Island, Indonesia
 Galang Refugee Camp, a refugee camp that accommodated Indochinese refugees from 1979 to 1996

 Galangal, or Galanga, a member of the ginger family: Zingiberaceae
 Galang, a "tribe" from Survivor: Blood vs. Water

People with the given name
 Galang Rambu Anarki (died 1997), Indonesian folk artist